Major-General John Randle Minshull-Ford  (12 May 1881 – 1 April 1948) was a senior British Army officer who briefly served as Lieutenant Governor of Guernsey before the German Occupation in 1940.

Military career
Educated at Twyford School, Minshull-Ford was commissioned into the Royal Welch Fusiliers in 1900. He served in World War I as commander of the 1st Bn of his regiment in the British Expeditionary Force and was wounded at the Battle of Neuve Chapelle in March 1915. He continued his war service as a brigade commander in the Home Forces and then in France from 1916.

After the War he was briefly a brigade commander in the British Army of the Rhine and then served as commanding officer of 1 Bn South Staffordshire Regiment from 1925. He was appointed commander of 5th Infantry Brigade at Aldershot Command in 1930 and General Officer Commanding 44th (Home Counties) Division in April 1934 before retiring in April 1938.

He was briefly Lieutenant Governor of Guernsey in 1940 just before the German Occupation.

Family
In 1912 he married Dorothy Harmood-Banner, a daughter of the Liverpool accountant and M.P., Sir John Sutherland Harmood-Banner.

References

|-

1881 births
1948 deaths
Companions of the Order of the Bath
Companions of the Distinguished Service Order
Recipients of the Military Cross
Royal Welch Fusiliers officers
People educated at Twyford School
British Army generals of World War I
British Army major generals